The 1990 mass uprising was a democratic movement that took place on 4 December and led to the fall of General Hussain Muhammad Ershad in Bangladesh. The uprising was the result of a series of popular protests that started from 10 October 1990 to topple General Ershad who came to power in 1982 by imposing martial law and replaced a democratically elected President through a bloodless coup.

The uprising is marked as the starting point of parliamentary democracy in Bangladesh after nine years of military rule and paved the way for a credible election in 1991. Bangladesh Nationalist Party led 7-party alliance, Bangladesh Awami League led 8-party alliance and Leftist 5-party alliance was instrumental in staging the uprising against Ershad.

About hundred people died during the protests those led to the upsurge from 10 October till 4 December, around fifty were the casualty of the violent protests and street fights started from 27 November after a state of emergency was declared.
General Ershad was arrested immediately after the uprising on corruption charges.

Background

Rise of Ershad
After the assassination of Ziaur Rahman on 30 May 1981 and the takeover of power by Vice-President Justice Abdus Sattar as the acting President of Bangladesh, Bangladesh Army Chief of Staff Lieutenant General Hussain Muhammad Ershad extended his support to the acting President Sattar. But later, General Ershad in an interview to The Guardian opined that there should a specific role of the military in the government and civil administration which was refuted by the President.

Infuriated General Ershad imposed a martial law on 24 March 1982 and declared himself as the Chief Martial Law Administrator. He replaced Justice Sattar with Justice A. F. M. Ahsanuddin Chowdhury as the President. On 11 April 1983, Hussain Muhammad Ershad suspended the constitution and declared himself as the President of Bangladesh.

Political opposition
The first major opposition Ershad had to deal with was the Anti-Majid Khan Education Policy movement in 1983. Amid state of emergency, hundreds of thousands of students gathered to protest the proposed education policy that was aimed at making Arabic a mandatory language to learn in primary level education. In the two days of street battles (14 and 15 February 1983) in the University of Dhaka, at least five died who were identified as Dipali Saha, Kanchan, Joynal, Mozammel and Zafar, since then 14 February is observed as Anti-autocracy Day in Bangladesh.

Soon after the movement, Awami League forged an alliance with 15 other parties and BNP forged an alliance with 7 other parties to resist the Ershad regime and launch a movement from September 1983. The movement was later slowed down due to the split in both parties and alliances.

General election 1986
In March 1986, Ershad declared that a general election would be held on 7 May. BNP led 7-Party Alliance decided to boycott the election and declared nationwide strikes to foil the election. 15-Party Alliance led by Awami League initially declared to boycott the election on 17 March 1986.

On 19 March at the Laldighi field of Chittagong, Sheikh Hasina declared:

But later, on the night of 21 March 1986, Sheikh Hasina declared that the Awami League and 15-party alliance will join the election.
Infuriated by the decision, five leftist parties including Workers Party, Jatiya Samajtantrik Dal etc. of the 15-party alliance withdrew themselves from the alliance after the announcement and decided to boycott the election with 7-party alliance.

The sudden participation of Awami League and its seven allies in the election gave a relief for next couple of years to the Ershad regime that had already launched a new party Jatiya Party and weakened the anti-Ershad movement for next couple of years.

Revival of the movement

After the defeat in 1986 general elections, Awami League led 8-party alliance took a streets once again that bolstered the movement launched by BNP led 7-party alliance and Leftist 5-party alliance in 1987.

The leaders of two major alliances of the time Begum Khaleda Zia and Sheikh Hasina decided to move for a unified movement against the Ershad regime after a meeting on 28 October 1987 at Mahakhali of the capital.

The movement reached a new peak in 1987 after the death of Nur Hossain who died during a police firing on a Jubo League rally. BNP, Awami League and all other parties started nationwide agitation in response to the police excesses. But eventually the movement in 1987–88 did not see much success due to the repressive measures from the government like the frequent house arrests of Begum Khaleda Zia and Sheikh Hasina.

Student movement

Beside the parties, the students and members of the civil society played an instrumental role in the upsurge. The Dhaka University Central Students' Union (DUCSU) has always contributed the most in the courses of history of Bangladesh. But during the lack of farsightedness and betrayal of some of the DUCSU leaders in 1980s, anti-Ershad movement lost its appeal among the students.

In February 1989, Bangladesh Chhatra League, Bangladesh Students Union and the leftist student organisations gave a joint panel under Chatra Shangram Parishad (Students Action Council) won the majority of the posts in the DUCSU election and Sultan Mansur Ahmed became the Vice-President of DUCSU. But this committee was proven as a failed one to challenge the regime and could not contribute much in the anti-Ershad movement.

In June 1990, Amanullah Aman-Khairul Kabir Khokan panel backed by Chatra Dal won the DUCSU election in full panel as well as almost all the hall unions of the university. Amanullah Aman became the Vice-President of the union with Khairul Kabir Khokan as the general secretary.

Routing all the organisation in the DUCSU election, Chatra Dal took the lead of the students' movement in the University of Dhaka campus.

DUCSU leaders and their followers mostly Chatra Dal men started holding rallies and sit in programs in the campus area in 1990 in protest to the Ershad regime. The huge activist pool of Chatra Dal started taking part in political programs declared by the three alliances from September 1990.

The Chatra Dal led DUCSU committee forged an alliance with all existing students group in the campus, Sarbadaliya Chatra Oikya Parishad (All-party Students Council) and staged a demonstration on 1 October 1990. According to the Military Secretary of General Ershad during 1990 Major General Manjur Rashid Khan,

The protests turned violent after the police firing on a rally of Chatra Dal on 10 October that claimed the life of Naziruddin Jehad, a Chatra Dal leader from Sirajganj who came to Dhaka to participate the nationwide strike called by the three alliances against Ershad.

On 4 November, the council of students rallied at the Gulistan area of the capital where they were met with police excesses. The students' alliance declared to siege the colony of minister's on 17 November 1990. The program turned into a violent one when hundreds of students from the university campus locked into a battle with police that left hundreds of students injured. The student body on 21 November held another procession and locked in a clash with police.

On 27 November, during a program of the students council, armed cadres of Jatiya Party opened fire on the students that ensued a gun battle with the armed cadres of Chatra Dal. While passing the Teacher-Students Centre intersection of the University of Dhaka, physician Shamsul Alam Khan Milon was shot by the Jatiya Party cadres and later died. This incident enraged the students and the council demanded the resignation of all ministers of the cabinet by 30 November and declared that if their demands are not met, the cabinet members would face dire consequences.

On the following day, the students came out from the campus with rally which was attacked by police and BDR personnel. On 28 November, stick-welding students from the University of Dhaka staged demonstration in surrounding areas of the campus. Students blocked the railway in Malibagh of the capital and forced the driver to stop the train and flee.

The series of student protests compelled the Ershad regime to think about a safe exit.

Joint declaration

BNP led a seven-party alliance, Awami League led 8-party alliance and Leftist 5-party alliance drafted a "Joint Declaration of Three Alliance" on 19 November 1990.

This declaration was basically a road-map outlining the process to hand over the Presidency of Ershad to a civil government. The declaration included the idea of a caretaker government that would take over after the fall of Ershad and would hold a free and fair election within 90 days of its arrival to power.

The formula of replacing Ershad as the president was:
 Compelling Ershad to resign from his post and appoint the Vice-President as his replacement
 The Vice-President after being appointed as the President will appoint a person whose name will be proposed by the three alliances as the Vice-President
 The Vice-President turned President will resign from his post appointing the newly appointed Vice-President as his replacement
 The newly appointed President will take oath as the President and will form a ten-member advisory council
 The President and his advisory council will have to hold a free and fair election within 90 days

Chronology of events
 10 October 1990
Nationwide strike observed by BNP led 7-party alliance, Awami League led 8-party alliance and Leftist 5-party alliance.

The strike claimed 5 lives, including the three BNP activists who were rallying in front of the central office of Jatiya Party and succumbed to death when the Jatiya Party cadres opened fire on the crowd.
 14 October 1990
Action Day observed by BNP led 7-party alliance, Awami League led 8-party alliance and Leftist 5-party alliance.
 16 October 1990
Half day nationwide strike observed by BNP led 7-party alliance, Awami League led 8-party alliance and Leftist 5-party alliance. Awami League declared a series of political programs demanding the resignation of Ershad
 27 October 1990
Nationwide bus-rail blockade observed by BNP led 7-party alliance, Awami League led 8-party alliance and Leftist 5-party alliance
 4 November 1990
Police attacks students rally in the Gulistan area of the capital, more than fifty students receive injury
 5 November 1990
Siege the Radio-Television building program observed by BNP led 7-party alliance, Awami League led 8-party alliance and Leftist 5-party alliance
 10 November 1990
24 hours long nationwide strike observed BNP led 7-party alliance, Awami League led 8-party alliance and Leftist 5-party alliance, another 48 hours nationwide strike declared
 17 November 1990
Siege the Minister's colony observed. Hundreds of students from the university campus locked into a battle with police while advancing towards Minister's colony at Mintoo Road area. Around one hundred students injured
 19 November 1990
The three alliances provide a road-map for the handover of power in a joint declaration
 20 November 1990
24 hours long nationwide strike observed by the three alliances, claimed two lives leaving hundreds injured
Residence of Begum Khaleda Zia came under attack during the strike
 21 November 1990
The student body on 21 November held another procession and locked in a clash with police
 27 November 1990
Dr. Shamsul Alam Khan Milon killed by Jatiya Party (Ershad) cadres in the university campus
Censorship imposed on the newspapers enabling strict monitoring, newspaper owners and journalists decided not to publish newspapers from the very next day

Ershad declares state of emergency, curfew imposed
 28 November 1990
Students defy curfew, stick-welding students hold rowdy processions all around the capital

Opposition leaders address a rally at Shahid Minar

Railway blocked at Malibagh, driver flee leaving the train on the line
 29 November 1990
All the teachers of the University of Dhaka led by the Vice-Chancellor M. Maniruzzaman Miah declared to resign from their post and would not return to classes until the resignation of Ershad
 1 December 1990
In the Mirpur area of the capital the BDR (now Border Guards Bangladesh) opened fire on a crowd that was rallying in support of nationwide shutdown called by the opposition parties that claimed five lives. In Kazipara of the capital, two died in police excesses

In the port city Chittagong a labour leader died when the Bangladesh Army men opened fire on a rowdy procession of the labour groups

A rickshaw-puller died during a clash in Narayanganj that day

During the night, five died in Mirpur including a student and two labourers

One succumbed to his injuries in Nilkhet area of the capital at night
 2 December 1990
General Ershad in a public address called for both parliamentary and presidential elections as soon as possible
 3 December 1990
Bombs were hurled at the Bangladesh Army controlled Sena Kalyan Sangstha building at Motijhil
 6 December 1990
Hundreds of thousands of people rally in the streets of Dhaka, the capital of Bangladesh paralysed

Ershad submitted his resignation accepting the demands of the parties

References

1990 in Bangladesh
1990 protests
Conflicts in 1990
Military history of Bangladesh
Political history of Bangladesh
Protests in Bangladesh
Revolutions of 1989
Student protests in Bangladesh